Toda una dama (English title:Quite a Lady) is a Venezuelan telenovela produced and broadcast by the RCTV network in 2007. It is an adaptation by Iris Dubs of the telenovela Señora, originally by the writer José Ignacio Cabrujas and broadcast by the same network between 1988 and 1989.

It stars Christina Dieckmann and Ricardo Álamo, along with Nohely Arteaga and Roberto Messuti in secondary roles.

It was the first telenovela made by RCTV after its release on the open signal in 2007. It premiered on November 7, 2007 at 10:00 p.m. m.. She was transferred at 9:00 p.m. m.. from December 18, 2007 at the end of Mi prima Ciela. When starting La Trepadora was moved again at 10:00 p.m. m.. and ended on July 13, 2008 with excellent ratings.

Story
Valeria Aguirre's life has never been easy ; she grew up as an orphan, not knowing anything about her origins, and as she got older, she got into trouble with the law because of her lack of finances. At eighteen, she is arrested for a minor shoplifting and ends up spending several years in jail, all because of Miguel Reyes, the prosecutor who took her case to court. Seven years later, a strange woman named Encarnación visits Valeria and tells her that she is the sister of Engracia (who is sick), the woman who raised her during her first years of life, she also visits Miguel and asks him to repair her injustice, unfortunately. a tragedy occurs, Marilyn, a violent prisoner decides to take revenge on Valeria for stabbing her and after a fight Valeria is temporarily blinded and Miguel, feeling guilty, visits her several times until he sets her free, on one of those visits Valeria falls in love with him for not being able to see it. After several situations (among them discovering that Dr. Diego is Miguel) she manages to be happy but only for a while since Engracia dies leaving her a role with a female name in which is the supposed key to her past, and with only that information she decides to find out his past. While she does so, several misadventures occur, including getting involved in a crime by accident, the death of Miguel's wife. However, Miguel, for his part, cannot forget Valeria and the two end up starting a stormy relationship full of misadventures. On the other hand, Imperio Laya De Trujillo, a powerful, irresistible and unscrupulous woman, hides a secret from her past. Obsessed with Miguel, she is willing to do anything to conquer him, so Valeria is an obstacle for her. Ignacio Caballero, who is Empire's lover, leaves her to follow the object of her desire: Valeria. Abandoned by Ignacio and scorned by Miguel, Imperio's fury will be ruthless and cruel, and Valeria will lose everything but her dignity and her soul to discover the truth of her mysterious past, Imperio will try to destroy Valeria even after discovering that Valeria is the daughter he believed dead several years ago. At the age of 16, Imperio was practically sold to a man much older than her by her family, who abused her both psychologically and physically and even sexually to the point of getting her pregnant, and believing that Imperio had cheated on him, he decided to make the girl disappear by telling her that the baby was stillborn. In the end, Empire manages to escape from him, and now with a great thirst for revenge and rejection towards all men, she uses her beauty and intelligence to destroy them, until she falls in love with Miguel. But he falls in love with her daughter instead. The anger, the lies, and the resentment caused by the thirst for revenge, will lead them all to take unexpected turns in the crossroads of the temptation to love.

Cast

Starring 
 Christina Dieckmann as Valeria Aguirre
 Ricardo Álamo as Miguel Reyes
 Roberto Messutti as Ignacio Caballeros
 Nohely Arteaga as Imperio Laya

Also starring 
 Alfonso Medina as Lennin Márquez
 Ámbar Díaz as Deyanira Blanco
 Nacarid Escalona as Carmen Barrios / La Leona
 Luis Gerardo Núñez as Vicente Trujillo
 Guillermo Dávila as Juan José Reyes / JJ
 Abril Schreiber as Alejandra Trujillo Laya
 Carlos Felipe Álvarez as Juan Moreira
 María Gabriela de Faría as Helena Trujillo Laya Galván
 Reinaldo Zavarce as Guillermo Galván / Guille
 Samuel González as Padre Emilio Amado
 Sandra Martínez as Marilyn Monroy
 Laura Chimaras as Ashley Rincón
 Miguel Augusto Rodríguez as Lucas Gallardo
 Ana Castell as Encarnación Romero
 Virginia Urdaneta as Eleonora Laya
 Esperanza Magaz as Engracia Romero
 Emerson Rondón as Enrique Galván
 José Mantilla as Eloy Castro
 Aracelli Prieto as Adoración
 María Antonieta Ardila as Miranda de Rincón 
 Alicia Hernández as Diosmary Toro
 Lolymar Sánchez as Coromoto Díaz
 Omaira Abinade as Berenice
 Relú Cardozo as La Cumbamba
 Carlos Herrera as Delgadito
 José Quijada as Calixto Rincón
 Gabriel Mantilla as Daniel Reyes Rincón

Special participation 
 Mirela Mendoza as Lorena Rincón
 Yoletty Cabrera as Whitney

Awards 
In 2007, El Universo del Espectáculo awarded the best TV creations and by popular vote via the internet, they award "Toda una Dama" the following awards, despite the fact that said telenovela was broadcast on RCTV in pay signal, the Venezuelan public decided :

References

External links
Toda una dama at the Internet Movie Database
Sinopsis de Toda una dama at caracoltv.com
Toda una dama at seriesnow.com

2007 telenovelas
RCTV telenovelas
2007 Venezuelan television series debuts
2008 Venezuelan television series endings
Venezuelan telenovelas
Spanish-language telenovelas
Television shows set in Caracas